Quality Schools International (QSI) is a group of non-profit international schools offering education in the English language, in a number of countries in Europe, Asia, Africa, the Middle East, South and North America. The first school was founded in 1971. The organization's world headquarters is located in Malta. The organization's founders and co-Presidents are Jim Gilson and Duane Root.

Associations 
QSI schools are accredited by the Middle States Association of Colleges and Schools (MSA). The chain is a member of CEESA, the Central and Eastern European Schools Association for US Overseas schools.

QSI schools serve as Collegeboard Advanced Placement and/or SAT testing centers.; they participate in the National Honor Society and the National Junior Honor Society.

QSI offers an International Baccalaureate diploma at some of its larger schools.

QSI is a partner organization with NWEA and offers the Measures of Academic Progress (MAP) computerized adaptive standardized test at all school locations. The United States government U.S. Department of State Office of Overseas Schools provides funding and assistance to QSI schools

History 
Quality Schools International is an outgrowth of Sanaa International School, founded in Yemen in 1971 by Jim Gilson. In 1991, Gilson founded QSI together with Duane Root.

Individual schools 

As of 2021, QSI operates 35 schools in 29 countries as well as an online school, Quality Virtual School.

In Europe, QSI operates schools located in Albania, Belarus, Bosnia & Herzegovina, Germany, Hungary, Italy, Kosovo, Macedonia, Malta, Moldova, Montenegro, Slovakia, and Ukraine. In Asia, QSI operates schools in China, East Timor, Kazakhstan, Kyrgyzstan, Tajikistan, Thailand, Turkmenistan, and Vietnam. In the Caucasus, QSI operates schools in Armenia, Azerbaijan, and Georgia. In Africa, QSI operates schools in Benin and Djibouti. In the Americas, QSI operates schools in Belize, Suriname, and Venezuela.

References

External links 
qsi.org

 
Educational organizations based in Slovenia
International school associations